Niko Bartulović (23 December 1890 – 1945) was an Austrian and later Yugoslav writer, publisher, journalist and translator known for being one of the founders and ideologists of the Organization of Yugoslav Nationalists in 1921. He joined the Chetniks during World War II.

Before World War II 
Bartulović was born on 23 December 1890 in Stari Grad, Hvar, Dalmatia, Austria-Hungary (modern-day Croatia).

Bartulović was the editor of journal "Pučka sloboda". In 1914, after the assassination of Archduke Franz Ferdinand he was arrested.

Bartulović initiated and organized the publishing of the literary magazine Književni jug in 1918 while Branko Mašić provided financial sources. At the end of 1918, after World War I, he publicly proclaimed in Zagreb that Dalmatia would join the Kingdom of Serbia alone, if Zagreb did not want to do so. Bartulović is known as one of founders of the Organization of Yugoslav Nationalists (ORJUNA) in 1921, and one of its main ideologists.

On 28 May 1933 he was one of the speakers during a great anti-revisionist meeting held in Belgrade against attempts to revise the post-WWI peace agreements which was broadcast by Radio Belgrade, Radio Zagreb and Radio Ljubljana.

During World War II 
In spring of 1943 Bartulović and two of his associates from Split travelled to Kolašin in the Italian governorate of Montenegro and met with the Chetnik ideologist Dragiša Vasić. Bartulović eventually joined the Chetniks.

When the Chetniks entered Dubrovnik at the end of 1943, members of the local ORJUNA established numerous Chetnik detachments that were merged into the Chetnik Battalion Lastovo.

It was speculated that Bartulović died as member of Chetnik forces at the end of 1943. Still, Bartulović participated in the Ba Congress held between 25 and 28 January 1944 where he was elected as member of the committee of the Yugoslav Democratic National Union, a new political party established during the congress. After the capitulation of Italy in late 1943, the German forces occupied Split and put Bartulović to prison because of his contacts with Yugoslav government-in-exile, and he remained in German prison from 29 March to 26 October 1944.

Death 
Many post-war Yugoslav published works contain an inaccurate date of his death as 1943. Some sources state that he was murdered in 1945, based on orders of the Communist Party of Croatia, with full knowledge and support of Vladimir Bakarić and the Communist Party of Yugoslavia, because he was a Chetnik.

Freemasonry 
According to some sources Bartulović was a freemason. Together with Ferdo Šišić, Grga Novak and Vasilj Popović, Bartulović allegedly belonged to the influential Freemason lodge Dositej Obradović, which spread ideas about integral Yugoslavism within the Kingdom of Serbs, Croats and Slovenes.

During World War II, Bartulović belonged to a group of Croats from Dalmatia who wished to establish a "Yugoslav Revolutionary Movement" which would include all Croats who had not aligned themselves with the communists or Ustaše and establish military units under the name of the "Yugoslav Legion".

Bibliography 
Bartulović's bibliography includes:
 Ivanjski Krijesovi. Novele", 1920, Tisak i naklada „Tipografija" D. D. Zagreb
 
 

 References 

 Sources 

 
 
 
 
 
 

 Further reading 
 Nikola Žutić, Нико Бартуловић – римокатолик четник'', Belgrade, 2010.

1890 births
1945 deaths
People from Stari Grad, Croatia
People from the Kingdom of Dalmatia
Yugoslavism
Croatian Chetnik personnel of World War II
Yugoslav writers
People killed by Yugoslav Partisans